Söğütlü is a village in the Midyat District of Mardin Province in Turkey. The village is populated by Kurds of the Kercoz and Omerkan tribes and by the Mhallami. It had a population of 2,309 in 2021.

History 
The village is a former Assyrian settlement that is chiefly populated by the Mhallami today. In the 1910s, many Mhallamis from the village migrated to Lebanon for economic reasons, while some Mhallami and Kurdish families settled in the village afterwards. The Kurdish families came from Kerboran and neighboring villages.

References 

Villages in Midyat District
Kurdish settlements in Mardin Province
Mhallami villages
Historic Assyrian communities in Turkey